Ahmed Aboki Abdullahi is a retired Brigadier General of the Nigerian army. As a Lieutenant Colonel, he was the Nigerian communications minister, a position he earned as a trained officer in the army signals division. He was at one point in time a general commanding officer. He is thought of as belonging to the group that supported the palace coup of General Sani Abacha in 1993.

References
{http://www.omoigui.com/files/palace_coup_november_1993.pdf}.

Living people
Nigerian generals
Year of birth missing (living people)
Place of birth missing (living people)